is a small, metre-sized Apollo near-Earth asteroid that was eclipsed by Earth and made its closest approach  from Earth's surface on 25 March 2022. It entered Earth's shadow at 8:10 UTC and became invisible until egress at 8:45 UTC. Its brightness from Earth reached a peak apparent magnitude of 13 shortly before closest approach at 09:13 UTC. By that time, the asteroid was moving at a speed of  relative to Earth and was located in the far Southern hemisphere sky.

 was discovered on 24 March 2022, by astronomer Krisztián Sárneczky at Konkoly Observatory's Piszkéstető Station in Budapest, Hungary. It was his next near-Earth asteroid discovery after the impactor  from early March 2022.

Notes

References

External links 
 
 
 

20220324

Minor planet object articles (unnumbered)